Safe House is a British crime drama, broadcast on ITV1, with the first series starring Christopher Eccleston and Marsha Thomason as the principal characters, Robert and Katy, who turn their beautiful picturesque guest house in the Lake District into a Safe House after being persuaded by one of Robert's former colleagues.

The first series of Safe House began broadcasting in April 2015, and following successful viewing figures, a second series - with a different cast - was commissioned and began broadcasting on 7 September 2017. Each series is made up of four episodes, each following a different set of guests who are forced to take refuge at the Safe House, whilst re-telling the story of how they came to arrive in the first place. The first series was released on DVD on 25 May 2015. The second series was released on 20 November 2017.

Plot
Former police officer Robert (Christopher Eccleston) and his wife, teacher Katy (Marsha Thomason) are approached by one of Robert's former colleagues, Mark (Paterson Joseph), who is looking for a remote location to offer as a safe house to a family who have been forced to go on the run. Robert reluctantly agrees, but finds himself drawn into a game of cat and mouse between a dangerous offender and the family he is trying to protect.

The first series was solely written by creator Michael Crompton, and directed by Marc Evans, known for his work on Hinterland and Collision. The second series was penned by the writing team of Ed Whitmore and Tracey Malone, both known for their work on Silent Witness, while Evans returned to direct.

Cast

Main

Series 1
 Christopher Eccleston as Robert Carmichael, a retired former police detective
 Marsha Thomason as Katy Carmichael, Robert's wife and a teacher at the local school
 Paterson Joseph as DCI Mark Maxwell, a former colleague of Robert

Series 2
 Stephen Moyer as Tom Broom, an ex-police officer
 Zoë Tapper as Sam Stenham, Tom's partner

Recurring

Series 1
 Jason Merrells as David Blackwell
 Nicola Stephenson as Ali Blackwell
 Peter Ferdinando as Michael Collarsdale
 James Burrows as Sam Blackwell
 Harriet Cains as Louisa Blackwell
 Max True as Joe Blackwell
 Christine Tremarco as DS Becky Gallagher
 Sarah Smart as Megan

Series 2
 Sunetra Sarker as DCI Jane Burr
 Gary Cargill as DI Oliver Vedder
 Ashley Walters as John Channing
 Stephen Lord as James Griffin
 Sacha Parkinson as Dani
 Joel MacCormack as Liam Duke
 Jason Watkins as Simon Duke

Episode list

Series 1 (2015)

Series 2 (2017)

References

External links
 

ITV television dramas
British crime drama television series
2015 British television series debuts
2017 British television series endings
2010s British drama television series
English-language television shows